Bitelli was an engineering company located in Bologna, Italy - the largest and, perhaps best known, Italian construction machinery firm. Beppino Bitelli produced his first three wheel roller in 1933 although it was not until 1957 that the Bitelli Road Mechanics company was formed.  Tandem rollers were soon added and In 1969 the first single drum rollers were manufactured.  In 1978 Bitelli built its first paving machine and, during the 1980s, road profilers and soil stabilizers were added to the line of road machines.

Shareholder company
In 1980 Bitelli became a shareholder company and the five brothers and sisters took over control of the business.  These were Gino Bitelli, Romolo Bitelli, Alessandro Bitelli, Luisa Bitelli and Maria Giovanna Bitelli.  In 1995 Bitelli was divided into four main product categories across 5 continents and 45 countries.
Asphalt Pavers 41.8%
Cold planers 20.7%
Single drum rollers 20.9%
Tandem rollers 16.6%

Sale to Caterpillar
On 2 May 2000 Bitelli was sold to Caterpillar and the Bitelli name disappeared  from construction machinery.  Some models were continued in the Caterpillar line such as the 200LE Cold Planer.  But most others were discontinued including the road rollers and most of the asphalt pavers.

Models

Pavers
BB30 BB50 BB52
BB632 BB642
BB660
BB670
BB621C BB651C BB671C BB681C BB781

Profilers
 SF100 SF140
 200L 200LE 200R
 202

Stabilizers
ST200

Rollers
Single Drum
C80 C100 C120 C170 C180
Three point rollers
TS8 TS10 TS12 TS14

Gallery

References

Manufacturing companies of Italy
Former Caterpillar Inc. subsidiaries